These are the Australian Country number-one albums of 2022, per the ARIA Charts.

See also
2022 in music
List of number-one albums of 2022 (Australia)

References

2022
Australia country albums
Number-one country albums